Richard Schmidt (born September 3, 1942)  is the men's basketball coach at the University of Tampa (NCAA Division II), where he has served since 1983.

Prior to his tenure at Tampa, Schmidt coached the Vanderbilt University for two seasons, and was an assistant for the University of Virginia.  He began his coaching career in 1969 at Ballard High School in Louisville, Kentucky where he had a record of 183–32 in seven seasons, including the state championship in 1977.

While at Ballard High School, he coached future Virginia Cavalier and NBA player Jeff Lamp.  He went to Virginia with Lamp and
two other former Ballard players.

Schmidt played at Fern Creek High School ('60) in Louisville and is a 1964 graduate of Western Kentucky University.

Head coaching record

See also
 List of college men's basketball coaches with 600 wins

References

1942 births
Living people
Basketball coaches from Kentucky
Fern Creek High School alumni
High school basketball coaches in the United States
Sportspeople from Louisville, Kentucky
Tampa Spartans men's basketball coaches
Vanderbilt Commodores men's basketball coaches
Virginia Cavaliers men's basketball coaches
Western Kentucky University alumni